Bashkala could refer to:
 Bashkala, another name for Başkale, a city in southeastern Turkey
 Bashkala, one of the two surviving shakhas of the Rigveda